The 1955 All-Big Ten Conference football team consists of American football players selected to the All-Big Ten Conference teams selected by the Associated Press (AP), United Press (UP) and the International News Service (INS) for the 1955 Big Ten Conference football season.

All-Big Ten selections

Ends
 Ron Kramer, Michigan (AP-1, UP-1, INS-1)
Tom Maentz, Michigan (AP-1, UP-1)
Lamar Lundy, Purdue (AP-2, UP-2)
Brad Bomba, Indiana (AP-2, UP-3, INS-1)
Dave Howard, Wisconsin (UP-2)
John Lewis, Michigan State (UP-3)

Tackles
 Cal Jones, Iowa (AP-1, UP-1 [guard], INS-1 [guard])
Norm Masters, Michigan State (AP-1, UP-2, INS-1)
Joe Krupa, Purdue (AP-2, UP-1, INS-1)
Bob Hobert, Minnesota (AP-2, UP-3)
Dick Murley, Purdue (UP-2)
Bob Skoronski, Indiana (UP-3)

Guards
Jim Parker, Ohio State (AP-1, UP-1)
Carl Nystrom, Michigan State (AP-1, UP-2, INS-1)
Wells Gray, Wisconsin (AP-2, UP-2)
Francis Machinsky, Ohio State (AP-2, UP-1 [tackle])
Dave Weaver, Ohio State (UP-3)
Dave Hill, Michigan (UP-3)

Centers
 Ken Vargo, Ohio State (AP-1, UP-1, INS-1)
 Joe Amstutz, Indiana (AP-2)
 James Bates, Michigan (UP-2)
 Joe Badaczewki, Michigan State (UP-3)

Quarterbacks
 Earl Morrall, Michigan State (AP-1, UP-1 [quarterback], INS-1 [quarterback])
 Len Dawson, Purdue (AP-2, UP-2 [quarterback])
 Jerry Reichow, Iowa (UP-3 [quarterback])

Halfbacks
 Howard Cassady, Ohio State (AP-1, UP-1 [halfback], INS-1)
 Tony Branoff, Michigan (UP-1 [halfback])
 Bob Mitchell, Illinois (AP-1)
 Walt Kowalczyk, Michigan State (AP-2, UP-2 [halfback])
 Harry Jefferson, Illinois (AP-2, UP-3 [halfback], INS-1)
 Ed Vincent, Iowa (UP-2 [halfback], INS-1)
 Clarence Peaks, Michigan State (UP-3 [halfback])

Fullbacks
 Bill Murakowski, Purdue (AP-1, UP-2 [fullback])
 Jerry Planutis, Michigan State (AP-2, UP-1 [fullback])
 Lou Baldacci, Michigan (UP-3 [fullback])

Key
AP = Associated Press, chosen by conference coaches

UP = United Press

INS = International News Service

See also
1955 College Football All-America Team

References

All-Big Ten Conference
All-Big Ten Conference football teams